Janadhipathya Kerala Congress also known as Democratic Kerala Congress is a  political party in Kerala. It was formed on 9 March 2016, through a split from the Kerala Congress (M)

History
On 2016 before Kerala Assembly elections a fight occurs in Kerala Congress (M) about seats and where who contest LDF used this opportunity and splits Kerala Congress (M). several P.J Joseph supporters left the party because they felt everyone with joseph is sidelined. politicians Included K Francis George , K. C. Joseph , P. C. Joseph and Antony Raju Left Kerala Congress (M) looking better Chances.

However All of them wanted KC(J) as their new party's abbreviation and purposed Kerala Congress (Janadhipathyam) as name. However Election Commission Give JKC as their abbreviation  and Janadhipathya Kerala Congress as their Name.
            
K Francis George elected as Chairman Of the Party . and contested on 2016 assembly elections but they didn't win any seats.

On 2019  K Francis George left party and joined Kerala Congress. On 14 March 2020, Dr. K. C. Joseph was elected as the new chairman of Janadhipathya Kerala Congress. They decided to stay with the LDF.

Minister from Janadhipathya Kerala Congress

Antony Raju (2021- )

References

Kerala Congress Parties
Political parties established in 2016
Political parties in India
2016 establishments in Kerala